William Seamonson (February 9, 1840 – April 8, 1903) was a member of the Wisconsin State Assembly.

Biography
Seamonson was born near Skien, Norway, on February 9, 1840 and immigrated to the United States as a child in 1842. The family initially lived in Muskegon, Michigan and then relocated to Pleasant Springs, Wisconsin in 1844. During the American Civil War, he served with the 23rd Wisconsin Volunteer Infantry Regiment of the Union Army, achieving the rank of sergeant. Conflicts he took part in include the Battle of Chickasaw Bayou, the Battle of Arkansas Post, the Battle of Grand Gulf, the Battle of Champion Hill, the Siege of Vicksburg, the Jackson Expedition, the Battle of Bayou Bourbeux, the Battle of Mansfield, the Battle of Pleasant Hill, the Battle of Spanish Fort and the Battle of Fort Blakely. Afterwards, Seamonson owned farms in Pleasant Springs.

On November 1, 1865, Seamonson married Ragnild Christophersdotter. They had three children before her death in December 1873. In 1876, Seamonson married Isabelle Tostensdotter Gullikson. They had nine children. Seamonson and his family were Lutherans.

Seamonson relocated to Neillsville, Wisconsin shortly before his death, and he died there on April 8, 1903.

Political career
Seamonson was a member of the Assembly during the 1876 session. Later, he was assistant sergeant-at-arms of the Assembly during the 1878 session. Other positions he held include chairman (similar to mayor) and town treasurer of Pleasant Springs, a member of the county board of Dane County, Wisconsin and delegate to the Republican State Convention in 1871, 1872, and 1875.

References

External links

rockvillemama.com
Ancestry.com
Vesterheim

Politicians from Skien
Norwegian emigrants to the United States
People from Pleasant Springs, Wisconsin
Republican Party members of the Wisconsin State Assembly
Mayors of places in Wisconsin
City and town treasurers in the United States
19th-century Lutherans
People of Wisconsin in the American Civil War
Union Army soldiers
Farmers from Wisconsin
1840 births
1903 deaths
Burials in Wisconsin
19th-century American politicians